Hélie de Bourdeilles (ca. 1423, at the castle of Bourdeilles, Périgord – 5 July 1484, at Artannes near Tours) was a French Franciscan, Archbishop of Tours and Cardinal.

Life
He was the son of the viscount Arnaud de Bourdeilles. Having entered the Franciscan Order at an early age, he was only twenty-four when, at the request of Charles VII of France, he was appointed to the See of Périgueux (1447).

During the wars between France and England he was held prisoner for several years by the English, in consequence of his defence of ecclesiastical immunity. In 1468 he was appointed to the Archiepiscopal See of Tours, and in 1483 he was raised to the cardinalate by Pope Sixtus IV. A stanch defender of the rights of the Church against the encroachments of the State, Bourdeilles advocated the abolition of the Pragmatic Sanction of Bourges, as may be seen from his treatise, Pro Pragmaticæ Sanctionis Abrogatione (Rome, 1486).

Bourdeilles continued, during his episcopate, to practise religious poverty and was intimate friend of St. Francis of Paula. He is mentioned among the Blessed in the Franciscan Martyrology for 5 July.

He also wrote Libellus in Pragmaticam Sanctionem Gallorum (Rome, 1484); and a Latin defence of Jeanne d'Arc which is attached in manuscript to the process of her rehabilitation.

References

Sources
Hugo von Hurter, Nomenclator (3d ed., Innsbruck, 1906), II, 1067–69
For full text of his treatise on Jeanne d'Arc see Lanery de L'Arc, Livre d'or de Jeanne d'Arc (Paris, 1894)

External links

1420s births
1484 deaths
People from Dordogne
French Franciscans
Archbishops of Tours
15th-century French cardinals
Year of birth uncertain
Observant Franciscan bishops